Walter Emanuel Treanor (November 17, 1883 – April 26, 1941) was a United States circuit judge of the United States Court of Appeals for the Seventh Circuit.

Education and career

Born in Loogootee, Indiana, Treanor received an Artium Baccalaureus degree from Indiana University Bloomington in 1912, a Bachelor of Laws from Indiana University Maurer School of Law in 1922, and a Doctor of Juridical Science from Harvard Law School in 1927. He was in the United States Army during World War I from 1917 to 1919, achieving the rank of Second Lieutenant. He was a professor of law at Indiana University Maurer School of Law from 1922 to 1930. He was a justice of the Indiana Supreme Court from 1930 to 1936.

Federal judicial service

On December 11, 1937, Treanor was nominated by President Franklin D. Roosevelt to a seat on the United States Court of Appeals for the Seventh Circuit vacated by Judge Samuel Alschuler. Treanor was confirmed by the United States Senate on December 21, 1937, and received his commission on December 27, 1937. Treanor served in that capacity until his death on April 26, 1941. He was interred in Walnut Hill Cemetery, Petersburg, Indiana.

References

Sources
 

1883 births
1941 deaths
Justices of the Indiana Supreme Court
Judges of the United States Court of Appeals for the Seventh Circuit
United States court of appeals judges appointed by Franklin D. Roosevelt
20th-century American judges
United States Army officers
People from Loogootee, Indiana
Military personnel from Indiana
Indiana University Bloomington alumni
Harvard Law School alumni